Antonio Tognone was an Italian painter of the Renaissance. He was a fresco painter of Vicenza, who was instructed by Giovanni Battista Zelotti, during his stay in that city (c. 1580), where certain frescoes by Tognone still remain. He died young in Vicenza.

References

16th-century Italian painters
Italian male painters
Italian Renaissance painters
People from Vicenza
Painters from Vicenza
Year of death unknown
Year of birth unknown